Hurley is an unincorporated community in Cherokee County, Alabama, United States.

History
A post office called Hurley was established in 1882, and remained in operation until it was discontinued in 1906. The community was named for Edmund Hurley, an early resident.

References

Unincorporated communities in Cherokee County, Alabama
Unincorporated communities in Alabama